C. princeps may refer to:
 Cervimunida princeps, a squat lobster species in the genus Cervimunida
 Coccophagus princeps, a wasp species in the genus Coccophagus
 Conus princeps, a sea snail species
 Cordulegaster princeps, a dragonfly species endemic to Morocco
 Cottus princeps, the Klamath Lake sculpin, a fish species endemic to the United States